Note: This article does not include any player or data of the original Ottawa Senators.

This is a list of Ottawa Senators award winners.

League awards

Team trophies

Individual awards

All-Stars

NHL first and second team All-Stars
The NHL first and second team All-Stars are the top players at each position as voted on by the Professional Hockey Writers' Association.

NHL All-Rookie Team
The NHL All-Rookie Team consists of the top rookies at each position as voted on by the Professional Hockey Writers' Association.

All-Star Game selections
The National Hockey League All-Star Game is a mid-season exhibition game held annually between many of the top players of each season. Twenty-one All-Star Games have been held since the Ottawa Senators entered the league in 1992, with at least one player chosen to represent the Senators in each year. The All-Star game has not been held in various years: 1979 and 1987 due to the 1979 Challenge Cup and Rendez-vous '87 series between the NHL and the Soviet national team, respectively, 1995, 2005, and 2013 as a result of labor stoppages, 2006, 2010, and 2014 because of the Winter Olympic Games, and 2021 as a result of the COVID-19 pandemic. Ottawa has hosted one of the games. The 59th took place at the Canadian Tire Centre, then known as Scotiabank Place.

 Selected by fan vote
 Selected by Commissioner

Career achievements

Hockey Hall of Fame
The following is a list of Ottawa Senators who have been enshrined in the Hockey Hall of Fame.

Retired numbers

The Ottawa Senators have retired four of their jersey numbers. Also out of circulation is the number 99 which was retired league-wide for Wayne Gretzky on February 6, 2000. Gretzky did not play for the Senators during his 20-year NHL career and no Senators player had ever worn the number 99 prior to its retirement.

Team awards

Molson Cup
The Molson Cup is an annual award given to the player who earns the most points from three-star selections during the regular season.

Other awards

Footnotes
 Finnigan was honoured for his playing career with the original Ottawa Senators. He was the last surviving Senator from the Stanley Cup winners of 1927 and participated in the 'Bring Back The Senators' campaign.

See also
List of National Hockey League awards

References

Ottawa Senators
award
award